Tevita Veicavuaki Ikanivere (born 6 November 1999) is a Fijian rugby union player, currently playing for the . His preferred position is hooker.

Professional career
Ikanivere was named in the Fijian Drua squad for the 2022 Super Rugby Pacific season. He had previously represented the Drua in the 2019 National Rugby Championship. Ikanivere is a Fiji international, having made his debut against Georgia in 2020.

References

External links
 

1999 births
Living people
Fijian rugby union players
Fiji international rugby union players
Rugby union hookers
Fijian Drua players